The 2016 British Athletics Championships was the national championship in outdoor track and field for the United Kingdom held at Alexander Stadium, Birmingham, from 24–26 June 2016. The event was organised by UK Athletics. A full range of outdoor events were held.

The championships  served as the main qualification event for the Great Britain and Northern Ireland team at the 2016 Summer Olympics for all events except combined events, marathons, race walks and the 10,000 metres. In addition, shorter track walking events were held during the British Championships that did not involve qualification for the 2016 Summer Olympics.

Medal summary

Men
Key:

.

Women

Other Olympic trials 
A number of qualification trials were held at other meetings to earn a place for the 2016 Summer Olympics, in addition to a small number of preselected athletes:

Key:

.

 10000 metres: Highgate Night of 10,000 m PBs:at Parliament Hill Fields Athletics Track. The top two British finishers in each race qualified if they have the qualification time. Jess Andrews made the qualification time to win the event, while Beth Potter, the second Briton, already had the time and also qualified automatically. In the men's race, neither of the top two British finishers made the qualification time. Following the event, however, Ross Millington made the time and secured qualification. World and Olympic champion Mo Farah has been pre-selected for the event at Rio.

Track

 Race walks:
 Combined events: Hypo-Meeting at Gotzis : Athletes had to achieve a top 12 finish and have the qualification score to achieve selection through the Hypo-Meeting event. Katarina Johnson-Thompson achieved the necessary place and score to confirm selection. World and Olympic champion, Jessica Ennis-Hill, was pre-selected.
 Marathon: 2016 London Marathon

References 

Results
British Championships Birmingham 24-26 Jun 16. Power of 10. Retrieved 2020-12-20.

British Outdoor Championships
British Athletics Championships
Athletics Outdoor
Athletics Championships
Sports competitions in Birmingham, West Midlands